Vincent Pilette is an American businessman who currently serves as Chief Executive Officer of Gen Digital, a Fortune 500 company specializing in consumer cyber safety with a family of brands including Norton, Avast, LifeLock, Avira, AVG, CCleaner, and ReputationDefender. Pilette previously served in a number of executive management roles at Logitech, Electronics for Imaging, and HP.

Early life and education 
Pilette was born in 1972 in Belgium.

Pilette holds a M.S. in engineering and business from the Université Catholique de Louvain in Belgium, and an MBA from the Kellogg School of Management at Northwestern University in Chicago.

Career 
In 2019, Pilette was appointed CEO of LifeLock, later renamed GenDigital after the 2022 acquisition of Avast. As CEO, Pilette led the separation of the consumer assets of Symentec and their transformation into NortonLifelock.  Pilette directed and implemented the strategy that led to the acquisition of Avast. As a result of its expansion strategy, GenDigital covers 500 million users in 150 countries.

Pilette brought to GenDigital over 20 years of operating experience in the technology sector, with positions at Logitech, Electronics for Imaging and Hewlett-Packard.

Pilette serves on the board of directors of SonicWall, a privately held company in the software space.

Personal life 
Pilette is married with two children.

External links 
 Official website

References 

American businesspeople
1972 births
Living people